Robert James Anderson (March 6, 1933 – June 6, 2008) was an American child actor and television producer, whose roles included young George Bailey in It's a Wonderful Life.

Life and career
Bobby Anderson was born in Hollywood, to a show business family. He was the son of Eugene Randolph Anderson, an assistant director and production manager, and Marie Augusta Fleischer, and his brothers and cousins were editors and production managers in their own right. He was also the nephew, by marriage, of directors William Beaudine and James Flood, both of whom were married to Anderson's mother's sisters. Anderson's film career as an actor was brief. In addition to his featured role as Young George Bailey in It's a Wonderful Life, Anderson had a cameo in The Grapes of Wrath. He appeared in the TV show Spin and Marty and he made his last film in 1956.

Anderson enlisted in the Navy during the Korean War, serving as a photographer on aircraft carriers. After his time in the Navy, he went on to work behind the scenes in assistant directing, then later production with Disney, Warner Bros., Universal, HBO, United Artists, Columbia, and 20th Century Fox on such films and TV shows as The Apartment, Hawaii, The Heart Is a Lonely Hunter, Code Red, Police Story, and Ripley's Believe It or Not!.

He also worked as a line producer and production consultant for films such as Passenger 57, Demolition Man and Heat.

Death
He died of cancer at age 75 at his home in Palm Springs, California. He was survived by his wife, 3 sons, 3 daughters and 11 grandchildren.

Partial filmography

References

External links

1933 births
2008 deaths
20th-century American male actors
American male child actors
United States Navy personnel of the Korean War
Deaths from cancer in California
Male actors from Los Angeles
United States Navy sailors